Anna of Masovia (c. 1270-after July 13, 1324) was a Princess of Masovia and was a member of the House of Piast.

She was the daughter and only child of Konrad II of Masovia and Hedwig, daughter of Bolesław II the Bald. Between 1289 and 1290 Anna married Przemysław of Racibórz. Anna was Duchess of Racibórz along with her unnamed sister-in-law. She was then widowed May 7, 1306. With her husband, Anna had the following children:
Leszek (b. ca. 1292 - d. 1336).
Anna (b. 1292/98 - d. 1 January/21 August 1340), married in 1318 with Duke Nicholas II, Duke of Opava.
Euphemia (b. 1299/1301 - d. 17 January 1359).

Is also believed that Constance, who ruled in Wodzisław Śląski until her death in 1351 was also her daughter.

When her son Leszek was old enough to exercise power over the principality, Anna probably moved to Wodzislaw where she lived with the consent of her son. She lived with her supposed third daughter Constance. After her death, Anna was buried in Raciborz, presumably the Dominican Church or the Dominican monastery.

Ancestry

References

Bibliography 
Group work Raciborz Millennium, Ed. News Raciborskie, Raciborz 2002, 

1270 births
Piast dynasty
14th-century deaths
13th-century Polish people
13th-century Polish women 
14th-century Polish people
14th-century Polish women